Tellefsen is a Norwegian surname.

Arne Tellefsen (1891–1973), Norwegian Olympic athlete
Arve Tellefsen (1936-), Norwegian violinist
Carl Tellefsen (1854-1908), Norwegian-American skiing champion
Christopher Tellefsen (born 1957), American film editor
Rut Tellefsen (born 1930), Norwegian actress
Thomas Tellefsen (1823–1874), Norwegian composer and pianist
Tom Tellefsen (1931–2012), Norwegian actor

Surnames of Norwegian origin
Norwegian-language surnames